The list of ship launches in 1749 includes a chronological list of some ships launched in 1749.


References

1749
Ship launches